Yevhen Alfredovych Chervonenko (born 20 December 1959 in Dnipro) is a Ukrainian politician and racing driver. He was governor of Zaporizhzhia Oblast from 2005 to 2007. Chervonenko previously served as Minister of Transportation and Communication in 2005. Member of Ukrainian parliament (Verkhovna Rada) of the 4th convocation (2002–2005). He is of Jewish descent.

Biography
He was born was on 20 December 1959, in Dnipropetrovsk. Yevhen Chervonenko studied at the elite Dnipropetrovsk school number 23. He extramurally studied at Physics and Mathematics School of Moscow Institute of Physics and Technology. In 1982 he graduated from the Faculty of Mechanical Engineering of National Mining University of Ukraine (Dnipropetrovsk). Being a student, he worked as a mechanic at Sovtransavto. During summer holidays he worked as a truck driver.

In 1982–1985 he was the design engineer of the special design department of the «Dnepromashobogaschenie» Institute.

In 1986 he became a professional car driver in racing, later – the member of the USSR national team, master of sports of the USSR of international class in rallying, prize winner of the European and USSR championships. In 1987 he established the first in the USSR professional auto racing team ″Perestroika″. 

As a rally racer the became the Champion of Ukraine and the Champion of Ukrainian Games (1983), USSR Master of Sports, member of the USSR national team (1985), winner and prize winner of the European Championship, Champion of the USSR Peoples Games (1988), USSR Master of Sports of international class (1989 ), USSR rally champion.

In 1988, he established the ″Trans-Rally″ freight company. 

In 1992, he founded the ″Lviv Van Pur″ joint venture company – the first company in the CIS that mastered the production of canned beer and canned soft drinks. 

In 1994–1995 Yevhen Chervonenko was the chairman of the ″Rogan Van Pur″ joint venture company, Head of the Industrial Group ″Ukraine Van Pur″, Member of the Ukrainian Union of Industrialists and Entrepreneurs (UUIE).

Since 1997, he has been a board member of the UUIE, Head of the Commission for the Development of Entrepreneurship, Vice President of the ″Kyiv-Taipei″ Society, member of the Council of Employers and Producers under the President of Ukraine, President of the ″Orlan″ Concern.

In 1997–2000 Yevhen Chervonenko served as the president (owner) of the ″Orlan″ concern, which specified in the production of non-alcoholic beverages and freight traffic. In 2001–2002 he became the honorary president of the ″Orlan″ concern.

Since 1998 he has started his political career. He was the People's Deputy of the Verkhovna Rada of Ukraine of the IV convocation, from the ″Nasha Ukraina″ (Our Ukraine) party. During the elections for the post of President of Ukraine in 2004, Yevhen Chervonenko headed the personal security guard of Viktor Yushchenko. From November 2004 to January 2005 he was the member of the National Salvation Committee. 

Since January 2001 – the President of the Shooting Federation of Ukraine. Since April 2002 – Vice-President of the Euro-Asian Jewish Congress. 

From February to September 2005 he was the Minister of Transport and Communications. 17 March 2005 Yevhen Chervonenko resigned deputy powers. He held the post of Head of Zaporizhia Regional State Administration in 2005–2007.

In 2008–2010 Yevhen Chervonenko worked as the First Deputy Head of Kyiv City State Administration. From March 2011 – the Head of the Aviation Department of the Emergencies Ministry of Ukraine, then – Assistant of Minister Viktor Baloha. He was also the Head of security of the President Yuschenko, who offered him to become the Head of The Ministry of Internal Affairs.

After finishing his political career he started a new project — "A2B.Direct". "A2B.Direct" is an online service that provides direct interaction between carriers and cargo holders at all stages. This service provides the search for the best cargo carrier, is able to keep in touch with the driver 24/7, provides the entire workflow cycle, insurance and legal support. Service users are able to track their cargo online and completely get rid of forwarding margins. Carriers and landowners are able to quickly find current deals and plan their load, reducing idle runs to a minimum.

Chervonenko was an independent candidate in constituency 79 (which included the cities Vasylivka and Enerhodar and surrounding settlements) in the 2014 Ukrainian parliamentary election. He finished fourth with 11.49% of the votes, winner Volodomyr Bandurov (and also independent candidate) got 21.81% of the vote.

In the 2019 Ukrainian parliamentary election Chervonenko unsuccessfully participated in a constituency of Odessa. In constituency 134 situated in Odessa's Malynovsky Raion as an independent candidate he with 16.85% of the votes finished second after Oleh Koliev of the Servant of the People party (Koliev Gained 35.12%).

In the October 2020 Ukrainian local elections Chervonenko is candidate for Mayor of Odessa for the party Nash Kray.

Awards and honors
 The Order of Merit, III class (1997), II class (1999), I class (2004)
 The Order of Prince Yaroslav the Wise, V class (2009)
 The winner of the contest ″Man of the Year″ in the nomination ″Entrepreneur of the Year″ (1999)
 The gold medal of the International Personnel Academy ″For effective management″ (2000)
 The Honorable Count of the Chivalery Order of the Archangel Michael (2001)
 The Winner of the All-Ukrainian program ″Leaders of the Regions″ (2002)
 Award weapon, presented by Interior Minister Yuriy Lutsenko
 The Order of the Polar Star(Sweden, 1999), awarded by the King of Sweden Charles XVI Gustav
 The Order of Merit for the Republic of Poland (Poland)
 The Order for Outstanding Achievement (2000)
 The Order of St. Stanislav, III class
 The Commander of the Order of Knightly Valor, II class

References

External links
 
 Yevhen Chervonenko. Kyiv Post. 18 November 1999

1959 births
Living people
Politicians from Dnipro
Businesspeople from Dnipro
Sportspeople from Dnipro
Ukrainian racing drivers
Governors of Zaporizhzhia Oblast
Fourth convocation members of the Verkhovna Rada
Transport ministers of Ukraine
Jewish ministers of Ukraine
Our Ukraine (political party) politicians
People of the Orange Revolution
Recipients of the Order of Prince Yaroslav the Wise, 5th class
Recipients of the Order of Merit (Ukraine), 1st class
Recipients of the Order of Merit (Ukraine), 2nd class
Recipients of the Order of Merit (Ukraine), 3rd class
Knights of the Order of Merit of the Republic of Poland
Dnipro Polytechnic alumni